Mika Miyazato (born 10 October 1989) is a professional golfer from Japan who plays on the U.S.-based LPGA Tour.

Career
As an amateur, Miyazato won the 2004 Japan Amateur Women's Championship at the age of 14, and was the youngest player to win the event. In the 2006 Asian Games, she won silver medals in the individual and team competitions. Miyazato turned professional in December 2008, after finishing in a tie for 12th in the LPGA Final Qualifying Tournament, a finish that gave her exempt status on the LPGA Tour. The medalist was Stacy Lewis, with Michelle Wie in a tie for seventh.

In her first season as a professional at age 19, she had fourth-place finishes at the LPGA Corning Classic and Wegmans LPGA tournaments in 2009. Miyazato's first professional victory came at the Japan Women's Open Golf Championship in October 2010. That year, she also had five top-10 finishes on the LPGA Tour, including two third-place results, and was 17th on the money list with more than $600,000 in earnings.

In 2011, Miyazato held the 36-hole lead at the U.S. Women's Open and finished fifth. She had three other top-10s during the season, and won nearly $600,000.

Despite a slow start, 2012 was Miyazato's best season. After missing three successive cuts in the early spring, she lost in the first round of the Sybase Match Play Championship, and did not have a top twenty finish through May. Miyazato rebounded the next week in early June with a tie for third at the ShopRite LPGA Classic in Atlantic City. The following week, she tied for second at the LPGA Championship, two strokes behind winner Shanshan Feng. At her next start at the Walmart NW Arkansas Championship, Miyazato again tied for second. After two additional top ten finishes at the U.S. Women's Open and Jamie Farr Toledo Classic, she won her first LPGA Tour event in August at the Safeway Classic in Oregon. For the season, she earned more than $1 million and had nine top-10 finishes.

In October 2013, Miyazato won her second Japan Women's Open title. With a birdie on the last hole of the tournament, she defeated Erika Kikuchi and Miki Saiki by one stroke. Miyazato made less than half of her 2012 earnings during the 2013 LPGA Tour season, with a pair of top-10s. Her earnings on the LPGA dipped to about $105,000 in the 2014 season, before climbing back over $500,000 in 2015. Almost $200,000 of her 2015 total came at the Walmart NW Arkansas Championship, where she posted a second-place finish. During the 2016 season, Miyazato's earnings dropped to under $300,000, putting her in 68th place on the LPGA money list. She had one top-10 finish in 2016: a tie for sixth at the ShopRite LPGA Classic. In 2017, she played in 10 LPGA tournaments, missing the cut in eight of them. Miyazato ended the year outside the top 150 in season earnings. Her LPGA schedule in 2018 was limited to two events, a missed cut at the Marathon Classic and a tie for 52nd at the Ladies Scottish Open. In Miyazato's only LPGA appearance of 2019, at the Toto Japan Classic, she tied for 69th.

Although both are from Okinawa, she is not related to former LPGA Tour player Ai Miyazato.

Professional wins (3)

LPGA Tour wins (1)

JLPGA wins (2)

Tournaments in bold denotes JLPGA major championships.

Results in LPGA majors
Results not in chronological order before 2015.

^ The Evian Championship was added as a major in 2013

CUT = missed the half-way cut
"T" = tied

Summary

Most consecutive cuts made – 8 (2012 LPGA – 2013 Evian)
Longest streak of top-10s – 3 (twice)

LPGA Tour career summary

 official through 2019 season

World ranking
Position in Women's World Golf Rankings at the end of each calendar year.

Team appearances
Amateur
Espirito Santo Trophy (representing Japan): 2004, 2006, 2008

Professional
International Crown (representing Japan): 2014, 2016

References

External links

Japanese female golfers
LPGA Tour golfers
Asian Games medalists in golf
Asian Games silver medalists for Japan
Golfers at the 2006 Asian Games
Medalists at the 2006 Asian Games
Sportspeople from Okinawa Prefecture
Ryukyuan people
1989 births
Living people
21st-century Japanese women